Leopoldo Manuel Vallejos Bravo (born July 16, 1944 in Santiago, Chile) is a former Chilean footballer. He played for 6 clubs in Chile and appeared for the Chile national football team at the 1974 FIFA World Cup, held in Germany.

Teams
 Universidad Católica 1964-1970
 Unión Española 1972-1975
 Everton 1976-1977
 O'Higgins 1978
 Everton 1979-1981
 Audax Italiano 1982
 San Marcos de Arica 1983-1985
 Universidad Católica 1986

Titles
 Universidad Católica 1966 (Chilean Championship)
 Unión Española 1973 and 1975 (Chilean Championship)
 Everton 1976 (Chilean Championship)

External links
 Profile at FIFA.com

1944 births
Living people
Chilean footballers
Chile international footballers
Club Deportivo Universidad Católica footballers
Unión Española footballers
Audax Italiano footballers
San Marcos de Arica footballers
O'Higgins F.C. footballers
Everton de Viña del Mar footballers
1974 FIFA World Cup players
Footballers from Santiago
Association football goalkeepers